The 2019 Czech Republic motorcycle Grand Prix was the tenth round of the 2019 MotoGP season. It was held at the Masaryk Circuit in Brno on 4 August 2019.

Classification

MotoGP

Moto2
Khairul Idham Pawi was replaced by Jonas Folger after the Friday practice sessions due to injury.

 Joe Roberts suffered a dislocated shoulder in a crash during qualifying and was declared unfit to compete.
 Dimas Ekky Pratama was declared unfit to compete due to effects from a concussion sustained at Dutch TT.

Moto3

 Gabriel Rodrigo suffered a broken pelvis in a crash during Friday practice and withdrew from the event.

Championship standings after the race

MotoGP

Moto2

Moto3

Notes

References

External links

Czech
Motorcycle Grand Prix
Czech Republic motorcycle Grand Prix
Czech Republic motorcycle Grand Prix